Mimoun Eloisghiri (born 15 September 1989) is a Dutch footballer who plays as a striker for Be Quick Zutphen in the Dutch Tweede Klasse.

Club career
Eloisghiri made his professional debut for PEC Zwolle on 4 November 2012 against SC Heerenveen but failed to make the grade at Zwolle and joined the amateur team of Ajax. He left them after only one season for Kozakken Boys and moved on for IJsselmeervogels a year later, only to have his season ruined by a back injury.

References

External links
 Profile – IJsselmeervogels

1989 births
Living people
Footballers from Rotterdam
Dutch sportspeople of Moroccan descent
Dutch footballers
Association football forwards
PEC Zwolle players
AFC Ajax (amateurs) players
Kozakken Boys players
IJsselmeervogels players
Eredivisie players